Luca D'Angelo (born 26 July 1971) is an Italian football manager and former professional footballer. He is currently in charge as head coach of  club Pisa.

Club career
D'Angelo began his playing career at Chieti in the late 1980s; he collected 100 caps in Serie B with Castel di Sangro, Fermana, Alzano Virescit and Rimini.

Coaching career

Early years
Following his retirement, he began his coaching career on 2009 with Rimini youth team. Next season he has been named first-team manager of the Serie D side Rimini.

In November 2013, he replaced Egidio Notaristefano as manager of the Lega Pro side Alessandria.

In July 2015, he signed a one-year contract for the 2015–16 season with Lega Pro side Fidelis Andria. After finishing the season at 7th place, on 7 May he announced that he wouldn't renewed his contract with the club.

For the 2016–17 season, he was appointed as the new coach of Bassano Virtus.

After being dismissed in 2017, he was appointed as the manager of Casertana.

Pisa
On 24 June 2018, he became the new manager of Pisa. He obtained promotion to Serie B with the team during the 2018–19 season.

Successively, he guided Pisa for three Serie B campaign, the last of which saw the Tuscan side fighting for a Serie A spot, ending the regular season in third place, just one point out of direct promotion. They ultimately made it to the promotion playoffs, where they were defeated by Monza in a two-legged final after extra time. A few days later, Pisa announced to have parted ways with D'Angelo after four seasons.

On 19 September 2022, following the dismissal of his successor Rolando Maran, he was re-hired as Pisa manager.

Managerial statistics

References

External links
Career on Legaserieb.it
Luca D'Angelo at Soccerway

1971 births
Living people
Sportspeople from Pescara
Italian footballers
Association football defenders
S.S. Chieti Calcio players
A.S.D. Castel di Sangro Calcio players
Fermana F.C. players
Virtus Bergamo Alzano Seriate 1909 players
Giulianova Calcio players
Rimini F.C. 1912 players
A.S.D. Victor San Marino players
Serie A players
Italian football managers
Rimini F.C. 1912 managers
U.S. Alessandria Calcio 1912 managers
S.S. Fidelis Andria 1928 managers
Bassano Virtus 55 S.T. managers
Pisa S.C. managers
Footballers from Abruzzo